Future Kiss is the ninth studio album by Japanese singer and songwriter Mai Kuraki. It was released on 17 November 2010, by Northern Music. The album was originally scheduled to be released on 20 October 2010; however, it was pushed back to 17 November 2010.

The album has spawned four singles, including the Japan top 3 hit singles "Revive" and "Beautiful", with the former becoming Kuraki's first song to enter within top three on the Oricon Weekly Singles Chart in the last four year, since "Ashita e Kakeru Hashi" (2004). Kuraki embarked on the concert tour entitled Mai Kuraki Live Tour "Future Kiss" in support of the album.

Promotion

Singles
"Revive" was released on 1 April 2009, as a double-A side with "Puzzle", which was included on Kuraki's second compilation album All My Best. The song served as the opening theme song to the Japanese anime television series Case Closed. A Latin-influenced J-pop song produced by Kuraki's long-time collaborator, Aika Ohno and Miguel Sá Pessoa, "Revive" was a commercial success. The double-A side single peaked at number three on the Oricon Weekly Singles Chart, becoming her first song to enter within top three on the chart in the last four year, since "Ashita e Kakeru Hashi" (2004). The single has sold more than 48,000 copies in Japan alone.

"Beautiful" was released on 10 June 2009, as the second single from Kuraki's second compilation album All My Best. The song was re-arranged as "Comfortable Version" and included on Future Kiss. The song peaked at number two on the Oricon Weekly Singles Chart and number five on the Billboard Japan Hot 100. The song served as the commercial song to the Japanese cosmetic brand, Salon Style by Kosé Cosmeport. The song has sold over 36,000 copies as of August 2018.

"Drive Me Crazy" was released on 3 March 2010, as a double-A side with "Eien Yori Nagaku". The song served as the Japanese theme song to the American science fiction television series Heroes: Season 3. The R&B-influenced J-pop song managed to sold approximately 30,000 copies and peaked at number four on the Oricon Weekly Singles Chart.

"Summer Time Gone" was released on 31 August 2010 as the fourth single from the album. The song served as the ending theme song to the Japanese anime television series Case Closed and television commercial song to the cosmetic brand, Esprique Precious by Kosé, in which Kuraki appeared. The song peaked at number four on the Oricon Singles Chart and number eight on the Billboard Japan Hot 100, selling over 33,000 copies.

Promotional singles
"Watashi no, Shiranai, Watashi." was originally written for Kuraki's second compilation album, All My Best; however, the song was re-arranged as "Precious Version" and included on Future Kiss. Original version of the song peaked at number twenty on the Billboard Japan Hot 100, and served as the television commercial song to the cosmetic brand, Esprique Precious by Kosé.

"Boyfriend" was performed at Kuraki's concert 10th Anniversary Mai Kuraki Live Tour 2009 "Best" Happy Halloween Live in October 2009. The Rodney Jerkins-produced R&B song featuring an American singer and songwriter Michael Africk served as the television commercial song to the cosmetic brand, Esprique Precious by Kosé.

"Tomorrow is the Last Time" served as the theme song to the Japanese anime television series Case Closed. The J-pop ballad song peaked at number forty-two on the RIAJ Digital Track Chart. "Tomorrow is the Last Time" was later included on Kuraki's compilation albums; Mai Kuraki Best 151A: Love & Hope and Mai Kuraki x Meitantei Conan Collaboration Best 21: Shinjitsu wa Itsumo Uta ni Aru!.

"Future Kiss" was written by Kuraki herself and her long-time collaborators, Yue Mochizuki, Takahiro Hiraga, and Masazumi Ozawa. Kuraki performed the song on the several television shows and the performances helped the song enter the Billboard Japan Hot 100 at number thirty.

Release
Future Kiss was originally set to be released on October 20, 2010, but the release date was delayed to November 17 due to longer than expected production time.

The regular version (Northern Music VNCM-9012) includes a bonus CD single "Boyfriend" which is done by Kuraki and Michael Africk. Some of the album covers feature a profile of Kuraki with her eyes closed. The limited edition (Northern Music VNCM-9011), indicated mainly by a profile of Kuraki's face with a hand covering her eyes, include the "Boyfriend" CD and a DVD with the Mai Kuraki Time Capsule movie.

Commercial performance
Future Kiss was released on November 17, 2010, and debuted on Oricon Weekly album chart at No. 3, selling 40,093 copies.
Despite its good chart performance, it sold 65,179 copies in total and became her fewest sales of her original album in Japan.

Track listing

Personnel
 Production
 Produced by: Mai Kuraki and Daiko Nagato
 Recorded and Mixed at Birdman West, Cybersound NYC and Boston, Red Way Studio
 Engineers: Takayuki Ichikawa, Miguel Sa Pessoa, Perry Geyer
 Mixed by Takayuki Ichikawa (Northern Music)
 Mastered at Birdman Mastering
 Chief Director: Tokiko Nishimuro (Northern Music)
 Director: Shun Sato (Northern Music)

Charts

Daily charts

Weekly charts

Monthly charts

Yearly charts

Sales

Release history

References

External links 

2010 albums
Mai Kuraki albums
Being Inc. albums
Japanese-language albums
Albums produced by Daiko Nagato